The 2012–13 season was East Fife's fifth consecutive season in the Scottish Second Division, having been promoted from the Scottish Third Division at the end of the 2007–08 season. East Fife also competed in the Challenge Cup, League Cup and the Scottish Cup.

Summary

Season
East Fife finished ninth in the Scottish Second Division, entering the play-offs defeating Peterhead 1–0 on aggregate in the final and remained in the Scottish Second Division. They reached the second round of the Challenge Cup, the first round of the League Cup and the third round of the Scottish Cup.

Management
They began the season under the management of Gordon Durie. On 4 November 2012, Durie resigned as manager due to illness. The following day Billy Brown took over as his replacement.

Results & fixtures

Pre-season

Scottish Second Division

Second Division play-offs

Scottish Challenge Cup

Scottish League Cup

Scottish Cup

Player statistics

Squad 
Last updated 9 July 2013

|}
a.  Includes other competitive competitions, including the play-offs and the Challenge Cup.

Disciplinary record
Includes all competitive matches.
Last updated 9 July 2013

Team statistics

League table

Division summary

Transfers

Players in

Players out

References

East Fife F.C. seasons
East Fife